A commercial artery of central Brevard County, State Road 519 (SR 519) is a  north–south highway extending from King Street (SR 520) in Cocoa southward to Barnes Boulevard (County Road 502) and an interchange with Interstate 95 (SR 9) in Rockledge. It is locally known as Fiske Boulevard.

North of King Street, Fiske Boulevard continues on to an intersection with Dixon Boulevard (CR 503), and ends further north within the Cocoa Hills residential subdivision.

South of Barnes Boulevard, Fiske Boulevard becomes Stadium Parkway (also not a designated State or County Road), which serves Space Coast Stadium in the Carl Barger Complex in Viera. The southern end of Stadium Parkway will eventually connect to the northern terminus of the St. Johns Heritage Parkway.

Major intersections

References

External links

519
519
Cocoa, Florida